Santarcangelo di Romagna is a town and comune in the province of Rimini, Emilia-Romagna, Italy, on the Via Emilia. As of 2009, it had a population of some 21,300. It is crossed by two rivers, the Uso and the Marecchia.

Main monuments
 Triumphal Arch (1772–77) was designed by the architect Cosimo Morelli. In front of the Arch there is the Town Hall of the mid-1800s, built on designs by Giovanni Benedettini
 Belltower
 Monumental Public Grotto
 Historic and Archaeological Museum
 Collegiate Church, built between 1744 and 1758 by the architect Giovan Francesco
 Malatesta Fortress (private property of the Colonna family), built in 1386 and of a structure with three polygonal bastions completed by Sigismondo Pandolfo Malatesta in 1447

Festivals 
Santarcangelo dei Teatri is an international festival dedicated to the contemporary scene. The spectacles are held in the streets and squares of the city. It produces and promotes theatre and dance, with a special attention to interdisciplinary experiences and international cooperation dynamics.

Started in 1971 with a strong political impulse, Santarcangelo Festival was called “International Square Theatre Festival”. Under the art direction of Piero Patino, it wanted to weave political requests linked to the movements of 1968 and the folklore inborn in the cultural tradition of Romagna.

Transportation
The city lies on the Bologna–Ancona railway and offers hourly connections to Rimini.

External links
Official website
Thayer's Gazetteer
Santarcangelo dei Teatri (the annual theater festival)
 Santarcangelo di Romagna
 Santarcangelo di Romagna

Sources